Hopea pierrei is a species of plant in the family Dipterocarpaceae. It is an endangered tree found in Cambodia, where it is still relatively abundant in the Cardamom Mountains,  but rare in Indonesia, Laos, Malaysia, Thailand, and Vietnam.

References

 

pierrei
Endangered plants
Trees of Indo-China
Trees of Sumatra
Trees of Peninsular Malaysia
Taxonomy articles created by Polbot